Boechera dentata, commonly called Short's rockcress, is a species of flowering plant in the mustard family (Brassicaceae). It is native to the eastern North America, where it is found in Canada and the United States. In the United States, its range is primarily centered in the Midwest, and in Canada it is only known from Ontario. Its natural habitat is in nutrient-rich alluvial forests and loamy bluffs, often on calcareous substrate.

Boechera dentata is a short-lived herbaceous biennial.  It can be distinguished from other Boechera in its area by a combination of short fruits (reaching 4.2 cm) on short pedicels (reaching 3.5 mm), which are held spreading at maturity, and its wider stem leaves (reaching > 8 mm) that have a pubescent upper surface. It produces cream-colored flowers in the spring.

References

dentata
Plants described in 2008